The Haagaas School (informally also Haagaas skole, Haagaas private gymnas or Haagaas' studentfabrikk), or simply Haagaas, was a private gymnasium in Oslo, that existed from 1915 to 1955. It was located in Niels Juels gate 52 at Frogner, in the same building as Frogner School. The school's founder, owner and headmaster until his retirement in 1946 was Theodor Haagaas. The school was a so-called "student factory" (studentfabrikk), offering a fast track to the examen artium (university entrance exam), in the tradition of the Heltberg School of the 19th century. As of 1946, the school had 20 teachers, five classes and 127 students, and was entirely funded by tuition.

Alumni
Finn Alnæs
Reidar Ditlev Danielsen
Henry Gleditsch
Mosse Jørgensen
Leif B. Lillegaard
Knut Selmer
Bernhard Stokke
Leif Tronstad

References

1915 establishments in Norway
1955 disestablishments in Norway
Educational institutions established in 1915
Educational institutions disestablished in 1955
Schools in Oslo
Gymnasiums in Norway
Private schools in Norway
Defunct private schools
History of Oslo